A command in military terminology is an organisational unit for which a military commander is responsible. Commands, sometimes called units or formations, form the building blocks of a military. A commander is normally specifically appointed to the role in order to provide a legal framework for the authority bestowed.  Naval and military officers have legal authority by virtue of their officer's commission, but the specific responsibilities and privileges of command are derived from the publication of appointment. 

The relevant definition of "command" according to the US Department of Defense is as follows:

See also
Chain of command
Command and control
Military organization
Tactical formation
Unit cohesion

Notes

Military units and formations by size

Command and control